Lucknerson Junior Mervil (born October 20, 1967), is a Haitian-Canadian singer-songwriter, actor and entrepreneur. He is known for his work in the French musical Notre-Dame-de-Paris, playing Clopin in the original French & English casts.

During early 1990s, he achieved fame as the front runner of pop-rock/funk band RudeLuck by winning music contest L’Empire des futures starts. He was approached by Luc Plamondon, to star in a Quebec/French cast new musical called Note-Dame-de-Paris. In 2001, he starts his film career with the French movie Betty Fisher et autres histoires from director Claude Miller and will appear in several films throughout his career. He revisited his theatre musical career this time in Quebec with Génération Motown which was shown in Québec city and Montreal. Mervil hosted acclaimed boy/girl band contest Mixmania, on Vrak-TV, which will earn him an Award for his hosting skills. He hosted a public affairs television program Le 3950 on TV5.

Mervil is also known for his involvement in his community. In particular when Hurricane Jeanne hit his mother land in 2004. He shared the profit of his single Ti peyi a with the CECI and  Medecins du Monde Canada. That year, for his implication and bringing the Haitian and Quebecer communities together he was named Patriot of the Year  by the Saint-Jean-Bapstiste Society. He release his creole album Ti Peyi A that year featuring songs like Ti Mari & Mezanmi that are known as anthems in Haiti.

Early life
Mervil was born in Port-au-Prince, Haiti. His family moved to Quebec when he was four years old. He lived in New York between the ages of 12 and 17, and then returned to Quebec.

Career

Mervil recorded several albums of reggae and rap music, including three with his band RudeLuck and later a self-titled solo album in 2000.

Mervil performed the role of Clopin is the original distribution of the 1998 Notre-Dame de Paris musical. He made several subsequent television appearances, and in 2001 acted in the film Betty Fisher et autres histoires in 2001.

Mervil was a spokesperson for the Canadian Centre for International Studies and Cooperation. He founded the charitable organization, Vilaj vilaj.

Personal life 
Mervil is a father of 3. 

Luck Mervil pleaded guilty in May 2018 to one charge of sexual exploitation for engaging in sexual relationship with a girl in 1996. The sexual contacts started when the girl was 17 and Mervil was 29, and continued after she turned 18. Despite age of consent in Canada being 14 years old at the time, the conviction stems from the fact Mervil was "in a position of authority" when the sexual contacts started while the girl was a minor. The judge, accepting the joint recommendation of the prosecution and defense, sentenced Mervil to 6 months to be served in the community, the first three of which under house arrest.

Discography
 1993 : RudeLuck (with RudeLuck)
 1995 : Two (with RudeLuck)
 1998 : Revolution (CD single, with RudeLuck)
 1999 : Aller Simple
 2000 : Luck Mervil
 2003 : Soul
 2009 : Ti peyi a

Filmography

Movies
 2001: Betty Fisher et autres histoires as François Diembele
 2004: C'est pas moi, c'est l'autre as Dieudonné
 2004: On the Verge of a Fever as actor and composer
 2006: A Sunday in Kigali as Raphaël

Television

 1997: Sauve qui peut! (series) as Christopher Étienne
 1999: Notre-Dame de Paris (special) as Clopin
 1998–2001: Piment Fort (recurring game show guest)
 2002: The Mess Age (English performance, recorded in Montreal)
 2003:  (VRAK.TV), show host

References

External links
 Luck Mervil Official Website
  Quebec Info Musique: Luck Mervil
  Chronique du Mercredi: Luck Mervil, 10 November 2004
 

1967 births
Living people
Canadian male film actors
20th-century Black Canadian male singers
Canadian rock singers
Canadian rhythm and blues musicians
Canadian male television actors
Haitian Quebecers
Haitian emigrants to Canada
Naturalized citizens of Canada
People from Port-au-Prince
Male actors from Quebec
Singers from Quebec
Haitian male film actors
21st-century Black Canadian male singers
French-language singers of Canada
20th-century Canadian male actors
21st-century Canadian male actors
Black Canadian male actors
Canadian male singer-songwriters